Stony Brook station was a Boston and Maine Railroad station in Weston, Massachusetts along what is currently the Massachusetts Bay Transportation Authority (MBTA) Fitchburg Line. The station was located adjacent to the Upper Post Road (US-20), with a building on the inbound (southwest) side of the tracks. It is named for Stony Brook, which runs through Weston.

History
Stony Brook station was open on the Fitchburg Railroad by 1858. When the Central Massachusetts Railroad was first being planned in the late 1870s, it was to have diverged from the Fitchburg Railroad mainline at Stony Brook Junction, just past the station. However, a separate route through Waltham was built instead, and the Central Mass instead crossed the Fitchburg on a bridge at Stony Brook Junction. The adjacent grade crossing of the Boston Post Road was replaced by a road bridge in 1930.

In December 1958, the B&M proposed to close Stony Brook station, along with ten other stations on the line. The station was closed along with seven of the other stations as part of systemwide cuts on June 14, 1959. In 1973, the MBTA proposed building a number of new parking garages to serve suburban commuters. One possible location was at the former Stony Brook site, but nothing came of that plan.

References

External links
Station site viewed from Route 20 on Google Maps Street View

Stations along Boston and Maine Railroad lines
Demolished railway stations in the United States
Railway stations in Middlesex County, Massachusetts
Former railway stations in Massachusetts